The Puerto Vallarta Open is a professional tennis tournament played on outdoor hard courts. It is currently part of the ATP Challenger Tour. It is held annually in Puerto Vallarta, Mexico since 2018. The city's tourism bureau gave its commitment to hold the tournament for five years.

Past finals

Singles

Doubles

References

ATP Challenger Tour
Hard court tennis tournaments
Tennis tournaments in Mexico
Recurring sporting events established in 2018